The Kyiv Park is a public park located in the Kaleva district, city of Tampere, Finland.

Tampere and Kyiv have been twin cities since 1954 and for the city of Tampere Kyiv was the first twin city outside the Nordic countries.

In the middle of the park there is a statue called Ystävyyskaupunkiveistos (literary "twin city sculpture") depicting two girls holding a hoop. The atelier house of Tampere is located at the edge of the park. A large part of the park is considered built cultural heritage.

References 

Parks in Tampere
Finland–Ukraine relations